Total: From Joy Division to New Order is a compilation album of material from Joy Division and New Order. It was released in the United Kingdom on 6 June 2011 by Rhino Entertainment and is the first album to feature songs from both bands in one album. It features five Joy Division tracks, including "Love Will Tear Us Apart", and thirteen New Order tracks, including a previously unreleased track, "Hellbent". A digital deluxe version also includes music videos.

In October 2019, the album was certified Gold by British Phonographic Industry (BPI).

Background
The record label were unhappy with calling the record a "Best Of", so after brainstorming with New Order, the title Total was eventually chosen by Bernard Sumner.

The album cover was created by Howard Wakefield who previously served as understudy to Peter Saville. Saville was involved in art direction and told The Guardian: "I realised this was a record that would be sold in supermarkets and advertised on television. So the cover has a 'pile it high, sell it cheap' aesthetic. As you open it out, it says Total, but folded up you just see the 'O's. It says, 'From Joy Division to New Order'. I couldn't bear the words 'Best of'. It's a long way from the independent record shop to Tesco, almost 33 years. At Factory, I had a freedom that was unprecedented in communications design. We lived out an ideal, without business calling the shots. It was a phenomenon."

The A&R for the release was handled by the band, Andrew Robinson (co-manager) and Gary Lancaster of Warner Music. In a bid to offer fans something new compared to previous compilations the album included four never-before on CD versions of the bands' tracks, including the original 7″ version of "True Faith" and Shep Pettibone's 7″ remix of "Bizarre Love Triangle". It also includes the shorter 4:24 edit of "The Perfect Kiss". All tracks were mastered from original source tapes by Frank Arkwright.

Reception

John Meagher, who wrote for the "Day & Night" section of The Irish Independent, wrote that "there's nothing here to attract existing fans of either bands. Instead, all Total does is to reinforce the idea that Joy Division/New Order was a hugely exciting source of music between 1978 and 1990 and New Order has been a pitiful shadow of their once-visionary selves ever since."

Track listing

 Tracks 1 to 5 performed by Joy Division.
 Tracks 6–18 performed by New Order.

 Tracks 1 and 2 performed by Joy Division.
 Tracks 3–12 performed by New Order.

Charts

Certifications

References

2011 greatest hits albums
2011 video albums
Joy Division compilation albums
Joy Division video albums
Music video compilation albums
New Order (band) compilation albums
New Order (band) video albums
Rhino Records compilation albums
Rhino Records video albums
Split albums